The 2021 FIA World Endurance Championship was the ninth season of the FIA World Endurance Championship, an auto racing series organised by the Fédération Internationale de l'Automobile (FIA) and the Automobile Club de l'Ouest (ACO). The series is open to prototype and grand tourer-style racing cars divided into four categories. World Championship titles were awarded to the leading manufacturers and drivers in both the prototype and grand tourer divisions.

The 2021 championship was due to see a significant overhaul of the technical regulations in the top class of competition. The LMP1 Prototypes used in the top class for the first eight years of the championship had been phased out and replaced by a new prototype specification known as Le Mans Hypercars (LMH). However, non-hybrid LMP1 cars were permitted to be "grandfathered" into the season.

The 2021 championship also marked the return to an annual calendar for the World Endurance Championship, switching back to a summer calendar after the late running of the previous season due to the COVID-19 pandemic.

Calendar
A calendar was revealed in December 2019 at the 8 Hours of Bahrain. Due to the COVID-19 pandemic, the previous season was extended into November 2020. However, the 2021 season will return to an annual calendar entirely instead of a winter calendar. A calendar for the 2021 season was announced during the 2020 24 Hours of Le Mans event. The calendar featured six rounds as opposed to eight and saw the removal of the 6 Hours of Silverstone, 6 Hours of Shanghai and Lone Star Le Mans when compared with the 2019–20 calendar as well as the addition of the 6 Hours of Monza. The decision to run a six-round series was made to save on costs due to the financial impact of the pandemic.  The 1000 Miles of Sebring was initially scheduled for 19 March 2021 as the first round of the season, but was cancelled in response to the COVID-19 pandemic and replaced by a race of the same length at Portimão on 4 April 2021. That same race would also be itself later postponed to 13 June, making Spa the site of the preseason Prologue and the first race of the season. The 24 Hours of Le Mans was originally scheduled to be run on the 12 and 13 June but was later postponed until 21–22 August for an increased chance of running the race with spectators. The 6 Hours of Fuji was cancelled due to ongoing travel restrictions in Japan, and was replaced by a 6-hour event in Bahrain.

Regulation changes
The championship introduced the Le Mans Hypercar category as a replacement for the Le Mans Prototype 1 class. Manufacturers are free to build and enter bespoke designs without homologation requirement or cars based on existing road-going models subject to a homologation requirement of building at least twenty road-legal models over a two-year period. A Balance of Performance system modelled on the system used by the GTE class is applied to ensure parity between hybrid and non-hybrid models. Manufacturers are given greater freedoms in designing the bodywork of Hypercars compared to Le Mans Prototypes provided that bodywork styling does not affect safety standards. LMP2 cars received a power decrease of 40 horsepower, to 560 horsepower, in order to maintain the performance gap between the new top class and LMP2. A specification tyre was introduced in LMP2, produced by Goodyear, ending the tyre war between Goodyear and Michelin.

Entries
Toyota announced plans to enter the championship under the Hypercar regulations with a bespoke car based on the GR Super Sport Concept. Toyota launched their GR010 Hybrid on 15 January 2021. In June 2020, boutique car manufacturer Scuderia Cameron Glickenhaus committed to a two-car effort with the Glickenhaus 007 LMH, in partnership with 1989 24 Hours of Le Mans winners Sauber Motorsport, 15-time Le Mans winners Joest Racing, and engine specialists Pipo Moteurs. At the 2020 24 Hours of Le Mans, LMP1 competitors ByKolles Racing Team committed to a hypercar programme with its own car, the PMC Project LMH, but the team were not present on the entry list announced ahead of the 2021 season. Aston Martin initially planned to enter a car based on the Valkyrie road-going model. However, the British manufacturer later decided to put its Le Mans Hypercar program on hold. Long-time LMP1 privateer team Rebellion Racing will end its racing operations at the end of the 2019–20 season, despite having previously announced the joint development of a Hypercar with Peugeot. Peugeot itself has announce plans to compete from 2022 onwards, and announced Ligier Automotive as a partner in its project. Alpine announced that it will enter the championship using a single rebadged Rebellion R13 LMP1, run by Signatech Alpine. In LMGTE Pro, Aston Martin Racing ended its factory GTE Pro program run by Prodrive to focus on their Formula One team and their LMGTE Am program.

Hypercar

LMP2 
In accordance with the 2017 LMP2 regulations, all cars in the LMP2 class will use the Gibson GK428 V8 engine. Entries in the LMP2 Pro-Am Cup, set aside for teams with a Bronze-rated driver in their line-up, are denoted with Icons.

LMGTE Pro

LMGTE Am

Results and standings

Race results
The highest finishing competitor entered in the World Endurance Championship is listed below. Invitational entries may have finished ahead of WEC competitors in individual races.

Drivers' championships
Five titles are offered to drivers, two with world championship status. The Hypercar World Endurance Drivers' Championship is reserved for Hypercar drivers while the GTE World Endurance Drivers' Championship is available for drivers in the LMGTE categories. FIA Endurance Trophies are awarded in LMP2, in LMP2 Pro/Am and in LMGTE Am.

Entries were required to complete the timed race as well as to complete 70% of the overall winning car's race distance in order to earn championship points. A single bonus point was awarded to the team and all drivers of the pole position car for each category in qualifying. Furthermore, a race must complete two laps under green flag conditions in order for championship points to be awarded.

Hypercar World Endurance Drivers' Championship

World Endurance GTE Drivers' Championship

Endurance Trophy for LMP2 Drivers

Endurance Trophy for LMP2 Pro/Am Drivers

Endurance Trophy for GTE Am Drivers

Manufacturers' and teams' championships
A world championship is awarded for LMGTE manufacturers and for Hypercar teams. FIA Endurance Trophies are awarded for LMP2, LMP2 Pro/Am and LMGTE Am teams.

Hypercar World Endurance Championship
Points are awarded only for the highest finishing competitor from each team.

World Endurance GTE Manufacturers' Championship
Points are awarded to the two best finishing cars from each manufacturer across both GTE categories.

Endurance Trophy for LMP2 Teams
Points are awarded only for the highest finishing competitor from each team.

Endurance Trophy for LMP2 Pro/Am Teams
Points are awarded only for the highest finishing competitor from each team.

Endurance Trophy for GTE Am Teams
Points are awarded only for the highest finishing competitor from each team.

Notes

References

External links
 

 
FIA World Endurance Championship seasons
World Endurance Championship